The Sennar penduline tit (Anthoscopus punctifrons) is a species of bird in the family Remizidae, the most northerly member of the genus Anthoscopus.
It is found in Cameroon, Chad, Eritrea, Ethiopia, Mali, Mauritania, Niger, Nigeria, Senegal, and Sudan.
Its natural habitats are dry savanna and subtropical or tropical dry shrubland.

References

Sennar penduline tit
Birds of the Sahel
Sennar penduline tit
Taxonomy articles created by Polbot